The 17th Battalion may refer to:

17th Battalion (Australia)
2/17th Battalion (Australia)
2nd/17th Battalion, Royal New South Wales Regiment
17th Armored Engineer Battalion
17th (Service) Battalion, Middlesex Regiment, the Football Battalion
17th Parachute Battalion (United Kingdom)
17th Battalion, Northumberland Fusiliers

See also
17th Infantry Battalion (disambiguation)